Energy in Libya describes energy and electricity production, consumption, and import in Libya. The petroleum industry is the primary engine of the Libyan economy.

Overview
From 2004 to 2008, Libyan energy production increased by 21.5% and energy exports increased by 27%. Domestic energy consumption in Libya was likely driven by industry and population growth. During this period, according to the International Energy Agency, the world population grew 5.3%, and the Libyan population grew 9.4%. As a net exporter of oil, Libya's energy production was also stimulated by growing populations in countries like Egypt (12.2% growth in that period), Yemen (13.4%), Sudan (16.4%), Saudi Arabia (2.9%), and Italy (3%).

Oil

Libya is a member of OPEC. In 2007, Libya was the world's 10th largest oil exporter, with 73 Mt in oil exports. As of 2009, Europe's share of Libya's oil exports was 78%. Domestically, the primary energy use in Libya was 237 TWh and 37 TWh per million persons.

The National Oil Corporation is the state oil company of Libya. The biggest oil producers in Libya are Eni, an Italian company, and Repsol YPF, a Spanish one. Other major producers in the country include BASF, Petrobras, Gazprom, Exxon Mobil, Pertamina, Nippon Oil, Sirte Oil Company, BP, Hess Corporation, JAPEX, and Oil and Natural Gas Corporation.

In 2010, 28% of Libyan oil exports went to Italy (over 284,000 barrels a day). In 2009, Europe's share of total Libyan oil exports were around 78%. Other importers in 2009 included China (10%), the United States (5%), and Brazil (3%).

Nuclear
Libya became a member of the IAEA in 1963.

Libya has a Soviet-designed 10 MWt research reactor in Tajura that was built 1981.

In the late 1970s Libya signed a contract with the Soviet nuclear company Atomenergoexport for two VVER-440 reactors, each delivering 440 megawatts (MW) of electrical power on the Gulf of Sirte. The reactors were intended to serve a dual-use for electric power generation and seawater desalination. As Libya was discontented with the technology the USSR wanted to provide them with, the Belgian nuclear company Belgonucleaire was asked to take over the contract. However, due to objection from the United States for concerns regarding misuse of nuclear weapons development, Belgonucleaire refused and Libya asked the USSR again. In the end, the project was stopped during its planning phase in 1986.

In 2006 Libya and France signed an agreement on peaceful uses of atomic energy, and in July 2007, they signed a memorandum of understanding related to building a mid-sized nuclear plant with Areva reactor for seawater desalination. This deal was opposed by Germany. This was followed by a memorandum with Canada, to share nuclear medicine, desalinization technology and co-operation over nuclear energy research.

In 2010, prior to the death of Muammar Gaddafi, Libya confirmed that it intended to create a nuclear energy sector.

Renewable energy 
The government of Libya promotes renewable energy through the Renewable Energy Authority of Libya. The Libya Renewable Energy Strategic Plan 2013–2025, released in 2012, sets a goal of 10% renewable energy contribution to the country's energy mix by 2025. Renewable energy will come from wind, concentrated solar power, photovoltaic, and solar water heating.

Libya is among 13 countries that have not submitted climate pledges under the Paris Agreement.

The country has a high potential for wind and solar energy. Construction has begun on a 100 MW solar power plant in the town of Kufra in southeastern Libya.

See also

List of power stations in Libya
Oil megaprojects (2011)

References